Nanqiao Town was a town in the northeast portion of Liling City, Zhuzhou City, Hunan Province, People's Republic of China.

Toponymy 
Nanqiao was named after the Lanxi Bridge, which was located within the town.

History 
Upon the establishment of the People's Republic of China, Nanqiao belonged to Hunan's District 1. Nanqiao Township was established in 1956.

In 1958, Nanqiao Township became the Nanqiao People's Commune, as part of the establishment of people's communes. Nanqiao was reverted to a township in 1984.

Nanqiao was upgraded to a town in 1995.

In 2015, Nanqiao was abolished, and split between the towns of Litian and Baitutan.

Geography 

Administrative divisions

Before abolition 
Before its abolition in 2015, Nanqiao administered 1 residential community and 15 administrative villages.

Residential communities 
Nanqiao's sole residential community was Nanyuan Community.

Administrative villages 
Nanqiao administered the following 15 villages:

 Dongtang Village
 Tongtang Village
 Jiangtang Village
 Qingshui Village
 Nanqiao Village
 Dacaoping Village
 Xinghu Village
 Yumin Village
 Fengxing Village
 Minglan Village
 Shixi Village
 Hongyuan Village
 Huamai Village
 Xinghuo Village
 Xinshu Village

After abolition 
Upon Nanqiao's abolition in 2015, all of its administrative divisions were merged into Litian, sans Xinghu Village, which was merged into Baitutan.

Demographics 
Nanqiao had a population of 40,556 per the 2010 Chinese Census, down from an estimated population of 41,500 in 2005. Nanqiao had a population of 39,295 in the 2000 Chinese Census, and about 41,000 per a 1996 estimate.

Transportation 
National Highway 106 and the  both ran through Nanqiao.

References

Historic township-level divisions of Liling